Venko Markovski (Bulgarian and ), born Veniyamin Milanov Toshev (March 5, 1915 – January 7, 1988) was a Bulgarian and Macedonian writer, poet, partisan and Communist politician.

Biography
Born on March 5, 1915, in Skopje, Kingdom of Serbia, (present-day North Macedonia), Markovski completed his secondary education in Skopje, later studying Slavic philology in Sofia. Markovski was a member of the Macedonian Literary Group founded in Skopje in 1931, the Macedonian Literary Circle in Sofia, Bulgaria (1938–1941). He is an important figure in contemporary Macedonian literature after has published in 1938, what was to be the first contemporary book written in non-dialectal Macedonian language, "Narodni bigori". As the most of the left-wing politicians from Macedonia he has changed his ethnic affiliations from Bulgarian to Macedonian during the 1930s,  after the recognition of the Macedonian ethnicity from the Comintern. However such Macedonian activists, members of the Bulgarian Communist Party, never managed to get rid of their pro-Bulgarian bias.

During World War II, in 1941 he was sent as a Communist activist to the concentration camp in  Enikyoi by the Bulgarian police. Between 1943 and 1944 he was a Yugoslav partisan in Macedonia, together with his wife and five-year-old son, Mile. He wrote some of the most popular partisan marches songs of the Yugoslav partisans. Markovski participated in the Communist resistance in Vardar Macedonia and was an active political figure in Socialist Macedonia.

In the period between 1944-1945, Markovski was present for three commissions for the codification of the Macedonian alphabet. As he recollected many years later, he tried to defend the new republic's alphabet from the "complete Serbianization", in particularly by defending the letter yer (ъ), which is used in standard Bulgarian orthography to express the mid back unrounded vowel (IPA ) (also common in many Macedonian dialects), but is absent from the Serbian alphabet. However, Blaže Koneski's point of view won, and Macedonians have no yer in their writing system.

Markovski openly supported the Cominform and was subsequently imprisoned at the internment camp in Idrizovo following Yugoslavia's expulsion from the Cominform. In January 1956, Markovski was once again imprisoned, this time serving a five-year hard labor sentence at the notorious labor camp on the island of Goli otok in the Adriatic sea under the name "Veniamin Milanov Toshev" for publishing—what the authorities considered—an anti-Titoist poem "Contemporary Paradoxes" in Serbo-Croatian and for his leanings towards the Soviet Union (see Informbiro).

In 1965, he left Yugoslavia supposedly in search of medical treatment in Bulgaria where he would remain until his death in 1988. In 1968 his family was expelled to Bulgaria. Markovski was accepted by the people of Bulgaria and soon began publishing in Bulgarian. Among many poems, dedicated to the ideal of Communism, he wrote a number of sonnets, publishing three books of sonnet crowns, dedicated to various historical figures. Markovski also wrote "Saga of Testaments", a history of Bulgaria in verses (with a total of 44,444 verses). Venko Markovski was a member of the Bulgarian Writers' Union, and a member of the Bulgarian Academy of Sciences (1979), and was awarded the highest Bulgarian orders, among them Hero of the Socialist Labour (1975), and Hero of Bulgaria (1985). He was a member of several Parliaments from 1971 until his death in 1988. Because of his works written in Bulgarian, Markovski was declared a traitor of the Macedonian nation and in 1975 was under the protection of the Bulgarian secret service as it was believed an assassination was being planned by the Yugoslav secret police, the UDBA.  After coming back to his Bulgarian roots and considering his involvement with the Socialist Republic of Macedonia, Markovski stated in an interview for Bulgarian National Television only seven days prior to his death, that the ethnic Macedonians and the Macedonian language are a result of a Comintern conspiracy.

Venko Markovski died on January 7, 1988, in Sofia at the age of 72. His wife was Filimena and he had two children, among them the writer Mile Markovski (1939–1975) and piano teacher Sultana. His two grandsons are the Internet pioneer Veni Markovski and journalist Igor Markovski.

Bibliography

In Macedonian

 Narodni bigori (1938)
 Oginot (1938)
 Ilinden (1940)
 Lunja (1940)
 Robii (1942)
 Elegii
 Goce
 Čudna e Makedonija
 Glamji
 Klime (1945)
 Nad plamnati bezdni
 Skazna za rezbarot
 Goli Otok (2009)

In Bulgarian

 Орлицата (The Eagless), (1941)
 Истината е жестока (Truth is Cruel), (1968)
 Леганда за Гоце (A legend about Gotse), (1968), a play
 Кръвта вода не става (Blood is Thicker than Water), (1971, 1981, 2002), a response to the book History of the Macedonian Nation
 Предания заветни (Saga of Testaments)(1978, also published in Russian)
 Писмо до другарката (Letter to My Love), (1979)
 Съдбовни мъченици (Fateful Martyrs), (1981), sonnet crown
 Бунтовни вощеници (Rebellious Candles), (1983), sonnet crown
 Вековни върволици (Ancient processions), (1984), sonnet crown

in English
 Goli Otok: The Island of Death (1984)

References

External links
Site with books by Venko Markovski and his son Mile Markovski
The site of Venko Markovski's grandson
Interview with Venko Markovski widow, Filimena (in Bulgarian) 

1915 births
1988 deaths
Writers from Skopje
Politicians from Skopje
Bulgarian writers
Bulgarian politicians
Bulgarian people imprisoned abroad
Prisoners and detainees of Yugoslavia
Members of the Bulgarian Academy of Sciences
Members of the National Assembly (Bulgaria)
Macedonian Bulgarians
Yugoslav Partisans members
Yugoslav emigrants to Bulgaria